UFP Industries, Inc. was founded in Michigan in 1955 as a supplier of lumber to the manufactured housing industry. Today UFP Industries is a multibillion-dollar holding company with subsidiaries around the globe that serve three markets: retail, industrial and construction. The company has been publicly traded (Nasdaq: UFPI) since 1993 and is headquartered in Grand Rapids, Michigan. In 2021, the company had over 200 locations in eight countries with 15,000+ employees and sales of $8.6 billion.

The company is listed in the Fortune 1000 list of America's largest corporations as of 2022, and in the 2005 Forbes magazine's Platinum 400 ranking of the best-performing U.S. companies with annual revenue of more than $8 billion, 

UFP Industries has 218 affiliated operations, which supply tens of thousands of products to three markets: UFP Retail, UFP Construction, and UFP Packaging.

References

External links

UFPI on Funding Universe
NY Times article

Forest products companies of the United States
Companies based in Grand Rapids, Michigan
Companies listed on the Nasdaq